is a Japanese former professional baseball catcher. He played for the Tohoku Rakuten Golden Eagles in Japan's Nippon Professional Baseball from 2014 to 2016.

External links

NPB stats

1991 births
Japanese baseball players
Living people
Nippon Professional Baseball catchers
Baseball people from Fukuoka Prefecture
Tohoku Rakuten Golden Eagles players